XHARDJ-FM is a noncommercial radio station on 107.3 FM in Arandas, Jalisco, known as Arandas FM. It is one of two permit stations operated by Grupo Radiofónico ZER via permitholder Impulsa por el Bien Común de Jalisco, A.C.

History
XHARDJ received its permit on April 30, 2013.

References

Radio stations in Jalisco